Robert Vincent Lenihan (July 19, 1929 – November 20, 2002) was a Canadian politician. He served in the Legislative Assembly of New Brunswick from 1967 to 1970 as member of the Liberal party. He lived in Moncton, where he owned a travel agency and also hosted radio show.

References

1929 births
2002 deaths
New Brunswick Liberal Association MLAs
People from Moncton
Politicians from Saint John, New Brunswick